Patrick Pourtanel (born 8 February 1946) is a French ice hockey player. He competed in the men's tournament at the 1968 Winter Olympics.

References

1946 births
Living people
Olympic ice hockey players of France
Ice hockey players at the 1968 Winter Olympics
People from Ris-Orangis
Sportspeople from Essonne
20th-century French people